Ǵavato is a village in the Bitola Municipality of North Macedonia. It used to be part of the former municipality of Capari.

Demographics
According to the 2002 census, the village had a total of 122 inhabitants. Ethnic groups in the village include:

Macedonians 122

Notable people
Metodi Simonovski Profesor at the faculty of Dentistry,
Pande Chumkovski Electrical Engineering Technologist 1949
Cveta Chumkovska teacher 1949

References

External links
 Visit Macedonia

Villages in Bitola Municipality